Trainer and Temptress is a 1925 British silent sports film directed by Walter West.

Cast
 Juliette Compton as Lady Maurice  
 James Knight as Peter Todd 
 Stephanie Stephens as Stella Jordan  
 Cecil Morton York as Sir Blundell Maurice  
 Sydney Seaward as Major Snazle  
 Violet Graham as Madge Jordan  
 Judd Green as Claud Wentworth

References

Bibliography
 Low, Rachael. The History of the British Film 1918-1929. George Allen & Unwin, 1971.

External links
 

1925 films
1920s sports films
British horse racing films
British silent feature films
Films directed by Walter West
Films set in England
British black-and-white films
1920s English-language films
1920s British films
Silent sports films